Bernard Dong Bortey (born 22 September 1982) is a Ghanaian retired footballer who played as an attacking winger.

Career
Bortey began his career in 2000 with Ghapoha Readers in Tema. One year later, he moved to Accra Hearts of Oak SC and became an integral part of the "64 Battalion" and a deadly force alongside Charles Asampong Taylor, Ishmael Addo, Emmanuel Osei Kuffour. Hearts loaned him out in 2002 to Al Wasl FC in Dubai, where he played for 6 months. He returned in June 2002 to Hearts where he won the league and shared the Top Scorer award with Charles Asampong Taylor.

Since 2015 in Sweden with Ånge IF, Bortey was without club until signing with Ghanaian club Accra Great Olympics in December 2019. However, in the beginning of January 2020, Olympics manager Prince George Koffie said, that he hadn't seen Bortey yet and therefore wasn't a part of his team. A few days later Bortey said that he didn't receive the financial benefits he was promised when he signed the contract and that he wouldn't play until they had paid him. On 6 April 2020, Bortey officially announced his retirement and expressed, that he would like to be a coach.

International career
Bortey played seven games for the Ghanaian national football team without scoring; the latest game being in the qualifying stage of the 2006 FIFA World Cup. He also represented his homeland in the 1999 FIFA U-17 World Championship in New Zealand, where he played 6 games and scored 3 goals, helping Ghana to third place.

Style of play 
Nicknamed "Dong Dada Diouf" a reference to Senegalese forward El Hadji Diouf due to similar style of play and his dyed hair.

Honours

Club 
Hearts of Oak
 Ghana Premier League: 2001, 2002, 2004, 2006–07
 CAF Confederation Cup: 2004

Song Lam Nghe An
 V-League: 2011

International 
Ghana U-17
 FIFA U-17 World Championship Third place: 1999

Individual 
 Ghana Premier League Top goalscorer: 2002
 GHALCA Top Four Top goalscorer: 2012

References

External links
 GhanaWeb Profile

1982 births
Living people
People from Greater Accra Region
Ghanaian footballers
Association football forwards

Ghana youth international footballers
Ghana international footballers
2011 African Nations Championship players

Ghapoha Readers players
Accra Hearts of Oak S.C. players
Al-Wasl F.C. players
Bnei Sakhnin F.C. players
Aduana Stars F.C. players
Song Lam Nghe An FC players
New Edubiase United F.C. players
The Panthers F.C. players
Ånge IF players
Accra Great Olympics F.C. players

Ghana Premier League players
UAE Pro League players
Liga Leumit players
V.League 1 players

Ghanaian expatriate footballers
Ghanaian expatriate sportspeople in the United Arab Emirates
Ghanaian expatriate sportspeople in Israel
Ghanaian expatriate sportspeople in Vietnam
Ghanaian expatriate sportspeople in Equatorial Guinea
Ghanaian expatriate sportspeople in Sweden
Expatriate footballers in the United Arab Emirates
Expatriate footballers in Israel
Expatriate footballers in Vietnam
Expatriate footballers in Equatorial Guinea
Expatriate footballers in Sweden
Ghana A' international footballers
Ghana Premier League top scorers